The University of Pennsylvania Band (commonly known as the Penn Band, or its vaudeville-esque performance name The Huge, the Enormous, the Well-Endowed, Undefeated, Ivy-League Champion, University of Pennsylvania Oxymoronic Fighting Quaker Marching Band) is among the most active collegiate band programs in the U.S. The organization is a part of the Department of Athletics at the University of Pennsylvania. Like most of the other 50 performing arts groups on the Penn Campus, it has no affiliation with any academic department and is sponsored by the Vice Provost's Office for Undergraduate Life. Typically ranging between 80 and 120 members every year, it is among the largest and most active student-run organizations on campus, performing up to 100 times during the academic year.  Like most of the Ivy League Bands, the Penn Band is a scramble band.

History

Founded in 1897, the Penn Band stands among the oldest college bands in the country, and one of the nation's first traveling bands (1901). According to popular legend, the band began after a single cornet player named A. Felix DuPont played to the jeers of residents in the student quadrangle ("Shut up, fresh!").  A more understanding upperclassman, John Ammon, helped DuPont gather 27 volunteers who formed the school's first band.

Its history is marked with a sustained record of performance and achievement.  In its first year, the Band performed twice for President William McKinley, as well as at the opening of Houston Hall, the country's first student union. The organization later became an integral part of Penn sporting events—one of the first college bands to play regularly at sporting events. It has been a staple at historic Franklin Field and the Palestra, and campus traditions such as ‘Hey Day,’ ‘Rowbottoms,’ and Commencement ceremonies.

Appearances during the 20th century include countless NCAA tournament games (including The NCAA Final Four in 1979), the Macy's Thanksgiving Day Parade (one of the first collegiate marching bands to ever march in the parade), the 1964 New York World's Fair, and the Miss America Pageant Parade (on more than one occasion).

During its history, the organization has performed with notable musicians, including John Philip Sousa, Edwin Franko Goldman, members of the Philadelphia Orchestra, the U.S. Marine Band ("The President's Own"), Doc Severinsen of The Tonight Show Starring Johnny Carson, and the prominent composer Václav Nelhýbel.  The band's performances also include national broadcasts and numerous recordings, beginning in the late 1920s and 1930s with the Victor Talking Machine Company (RCA-Victor Company) and nationally broadcast performances on WABC. In popular culture, Chuck Barris of Gong Show fame performed with the Band in 1977, and the Band opened for the Maury Povich Show in 1980.

The group has performed at the pleasure of many dignitaries and celebrities over its history in the context of celebrations on-campus and within the city of Philadelphia.  This list includes Governor Ed Rendell, Vice President Al Gore, Grace Kelly, President Ronald Reagan, Bill Cosby, Lech Wałęsa, President Theodore Roosevelt, President Lyndon B. Johnson, Peter Lynch, Dolly Parton, Dan Aykroyd, Chris Matthews, and Rudy Giuliani.

By the 1970s, along with most of the other Ivy League bands, the Penn Band became a scramble band.  However, it had begun moving away from the traditional corps style in the 1940s.  Its current uniform, however, is an inadvertent nod to the past—it is a near-exact copy of the uniform worn by the freshman band in the early 1930s.

The first one hundred years of the organization's history was recently described in a book from Arcadia Publishing: Images of America:The University of Pennsylvania Band (2006).

The Penn Band today

Today, the Penn Band is a bastion of music and mirth on the Penn Campus, performing at campus events and traditions, all Football games, and nearly all Men's and Women's Basketball games. The group also tours along the East Coast; in the past decade, the group has toured Walt Disney World and Universal Studios in Orlando, Florida, as well as San Diego, California.  The group's appearances include eight NCAA tournament games on national television in the past fifteen years, ESPN Game Day Live, MSNBC Hardball, and the Fox and Friends Morning Show. In 2007, the band had the opportunity to perform with rock drummer Simon Kirke on the Penn campus.  In December 2008, the Band appeared on a nationally televised sports special on CBS Sports, and in April 2008, the Band performed for Bill Clinton and Hillary Clinton at an election rally on the Penn campus.  Today, the Penn Band stands as one of the few, if not the only, college bands in the country that attends all conference men's basketball games, both home and away.

Famous alumni

Roland F. Seitz, famous Bandmaster and composer of "The University of Pennsylvania Band March"
Adolph Vogel, former director of the Penn Band (1908–1941) and former member of the Philadelphia Orchestra
George T. "Red" Bird, former director of the Penn Band (1950-1952), the Cleveland Browns football band, pioneering what eventually became the "Big-10" style of marching.
Lucien Cailliet, former member of the Philadelphia Orchestra and arranger of the Penn fight songs for marching band
James DePreist, Class of 1957
Allan Jaffe, tubist and founder, Preservation Hall
Ted Weems, Class of 1944
Elliot Lawrence, Class of 1944
Bruce Montgomery, longtime Penn Glee Club Director and former Director of the Band (1957–1958)
Greer Cheeseman, current band director and originator of toast-throwing tradition
A. Felix du Pont, businessperson and philanthropist. A co-founder of the Penn Band
Billy Goeckel, first baseman for the Philadelphia Phillies. Composer of "The Red and Blue." A co-founder of the Penn Band.

Traditions
Script Penn – At Homecoming, the Band and Band Alumni form a script PENN on the field during the halftime show
Toast-throwing – At every home Penn football game, during the singing of "Drink a Highball" after the third quarter, fans throw a piece of toast onto the field while the band plays the lyrics 'here's a toast to dear old Penn.' This was started by the band's current director, Greer Cheeseman, in a reference to The Rocky Horror Picture Show.
Hang Jeff Davis – The Band plays Hang Jeff Davis every time the Penn football team scores a one-point goal.
Alumni Day and Commencement – The Band leads the parade of alumni and graduates during these springtime festivities.*
"Hey—Rowbottom!" or "Yea Rowbottom!" was a common cry on the West Philadelphia campus from about 1910 until the 1970s. Once a "Rowbottom" got underway, automobiles might be overturned, windows smashed, and trolley tracks doused with gasoline and set ablaze. In the 1940s "panty raids" of the women's dormitories became a prominent feature. Rowbottoms were most frequent in the fall, particularly after football games.

Songs
Hail, Pennsylvania! (The Alma Mater)
The Red and Blue
The Field Cry of Penn ("Hang Jeff Davis")
Cheer Pennsylvania!
Drink a Highball
Fight on, Pennsylvania!
Men of Pennsylvania
The University of Pennsylvania Band March
In 1901, the renowned bandmaster Roland F. Seitz (1867–1946) of Glen Rock, Pennsylvania wrote the famous University of Pennsylvania Band March. The march is generally regarded as one of the finest compositions ever written for a student band, and ultimately was adapted by many other organizations throughout the country.
Franklin Field March
Edwin Franko Goldman, who was generally regarded only second to John Philip Sousa in the early 20th century, composed the Franklin Field March for the University of Pennsylvania Band. On November 5, 1932, Goldman's Franklin Field March was performed for the first time at the annual University of Pittsburgh-University of Pennsylvania football game.

Discography (known)

The University of Pennsylvania Band (RCA Victor #20040, 1926)
Songs of Pennsylvania (Marquis Recordings MR-107, MR-108, MR-109, MR-110, 1950)
The Songs of the University of Pennsylvania (with Penn Glee Club, RCA, 1955)
University of Pennsylvania Glee Club, assisted by Penn Pipers and the University Of Pennsylvania Band (Recorded Publications Company 32M-4055, 1958)
The University of Pennsylvania Symphonic Band (1963)
 Sports Marches: The University of Pennsylvania Band and the All-American Band (SESAC, 1965)
Cheer Pennsylvania! (1983)
Penn Band: World Tour (1986)
Live at Smoke's (1989)
A Toast to Dear Old Penn (1993)
Five Score and Several Years to Go (1997)
The Band That Rocks the Cradle (2001)
The Band Before Time (2007)
Where in the World is the Penn Band? (2012)
The Band in Space (2016)
The Penn Band Breaks...The Internet! (2020)

References

External links
www.pennband.net
Facebook
Twitter
Penn Band Travel History on Google Maps

Scramble bands
Band
College marching bands in the United States
Musical groups established in 1897
1897 establishments in Pennsylvania